Classified: The Sentinel Crisis is a budget first-person shooter video game for the Xbox. It was developed by Torus Games and published by Global Star Software. A PlayStation 2 version was planned but was cancelled for unknown reasons.

Plot 
The plot follows the story of a black ops soldier recruited for the military's Sentinel program, which involves an "intelligent" suit and multifunction rifle. The soldier must locate Landau, the traitorous scientist responsible for its creation, before the technology ends up in the wrong hands. Landau has formed a companionship with Dragomir Radovan, a powerful and dangerous Eastern European general. Their alliance has forced a further companionship between the player (the black ops soldier) and Karlo, who is the leader of a revolutionary movement.

Later in the game, once it is discovered that Landau is a traitor and plans on marketing his revolutionary creation in a maniacal technological installation, the player is captured and must escape. After the escape, the black ops soldier is ordered to execute Radulov from a distance and in the end of the game, battles against Landau, who wears an upgraded re-energizing suit (a newer model in comparison to that of the player). After taking out Landau, the game is completed, although Karlo dies in the battlefield, and the black ops soldier is left to lead his organization.

Reception 
The game generally received negative reviews. IGN gave it a 2.1 out of 10, citing "one short game mode", "nauseatingly simple" gameplay, and "dreary AI". GameSpot gave it a 5.4 for "archaic" graphics, "bone-headed decisions" from enemies, and "a six-hour-long single-player campaign".

References

External links 
 The developer's page on the game

2005 video games
Fiction about assassinations
Xbox games
Xbox-only games
First-person shooters
Video games developed in Australia
Cancelled PlayStation 2 games
RenderWare games
Torus Games games
Single-player video games
Global Star Software games